The Hon. Damon James Bossino, MP, (born 10 August 1983) is a Gibraltarian barrister and Member of the Gibraltar Parliament representing the Gibraltar Social Democrats. He is married to Rosa Arrimadas from Spain with whom he has three children.

Biography 
Damon Bossino was educated at Bayside Comprehensive School, where he was a contemporary of Fabian Picardo, the incumbent Chief Minister and leader of the Gibraltar Socialist Labour Party. He studied law in England (Kingston University) and after completing his Bar Professional Training Course at the Inns of Court School of Law, he was admitted to the Bar in 1995 (England and Gibraltar).

Bossino was a candidate in the 1996 general elections by the Gibraltar National Party (GNP), at the age of 24, with many still recalling the concession speech delivered on behalf of the party the morning after the vote. He left what then became the Liberal Party before the 2000 general elections on the ground of its alliance with the GSLP. Prior to the election and up to the time of his resigning from the party he participated in political debates and interviews on TV and radio. He remained out of front line politics until he stood at the last general election but has been a keen follower of the political scene during that time.

In the 2011 general election he was elected as an MP for the  Gibraltar Social Democrats and appointed shadow minister for Transport and Tourism. He has had a keen interest in politics since his teens, having participated in school and TV debates on political subjects with Fabian Picardo who was in the same school year, with both making their TV debut debating politics in a programme chaired by Clive Golt in 1991 called ‘Live from the Rock’ which was filmed from the Rock Hotel.

Bossino was appointed Deputy Leader of the GSD on 17 March 2014. He is opposed to the Brussels process and is an advocate of tripartite, open agenda dialogue with Spain, all of which, he has argued, were achieved in the context of the Trilateral Forum of Dialogue secured during the third GSD term. He is firm in his view that the sovereignty of Gibraltar is not a matter for negotiation with Spain.

References

External links 
 Personal website
 Damon Bossino at the GSD website.
 Feetham vs. Bossino: GSD initiate transition period to new leadership

Alumni of Kingston University
Gibraltar Social Democrats politicians
Gibraltarian barristers
Living people
1983 births
21st-century Gibraltarian lawyers